is a railway station in Iwamizawa, Hokkaido, Japan, operated by the Hokkaido Railway Company (JR Hokkaido). The station is numbered A13.

Lines
Iwamizawa Station is served by the Hakodate Main Line and Muroran Main Line.

Station layout
The station consists of one side platform and two island platforms serving five tracks. The station has automated ticket machines, automated turnstiles which accept Kitaca, and a "Midori no Madoguchi" staffed ticket office.

Platforms

See also
 List of railway stations in Japan

References

Railway stations in Hokkaido Prefecture
Railway stations in Japan opened in 1884